This list shows the IUCN Red List status of the 90 mammal species occurring in Serbia. Five of them are vulnerable, seven are near threatened, one is reintroduced, and one is introduced.

The following tags are used to highlight each species' status on the respective IUCN Red List published by the International Union for Conservation of Nature:

Order: Rodentia
There are twenty-nine species of rodent in Serbia. Two species are vulnerable. One species is reintroduced and two species are introduced.

Order: Lagomorpha
There is one species of lagomorph in Serbia.

Order: Eulipotyphla
There are ten species of eulipotyph in Serbia. One species is near threatened.

Order: Chiroptera
There are thirty-one species of bat in Serbia. Two species are vulnerable and five species are near threatened.

Order: Carnivora
There are fourteen species of carnivore in Serbia. One species is vulnerable and one species is near threatened.

Order: Artiodactyla
There are five species of even-toed ungulate in Serbia.

Locally extinct 
The following species are locally extinct in the country:
 European bison, Bison bonasus
 European mink, Mustela lutreola

See also
List of chordate orders
Lists of mammals by region

References

Serbia
Mammals
Mammals
Serbia